Efron is a Jewish surname. It is taken from the Biblical place name, . Another version to it is the demonym Efroni.

Notable people with the surname include:

 Bradley Efron (born 1938), American statistician
 Edith Efron (1922–2001), American libertarian
 Inés Efron (born 1984), Argentine actress
 Marshall Efron (1938-2019), American actor
 Nora Ephron (1941–2012) playwright, screenwriter, novelist, producer, director
 Paloma Efron (1912–1977), Argentine singer
 Sergei Efron (1893–1941), Russian poet, officer of White Army and later NKVD agent
 Zac Efron (born 1987), American actor and singer

See also
Efron's dice, a set of four nontransitive dice invented by Bradley Efron
Brockhaus and Efron Encyclopedic Dictionary
Ephron
Effron
:sv:Vera Efron (born 1959), an editor and author in Sweden

References

Jewish surnames
Hebrew-language surnames